Plan Man is a South Korean travel-reality show. Hosted by Eun Ji-won, the concept revolves around Eun acting as a travel agent and planning a trip for the celebrity participants.

Season 1

Season 2

New Beginning
 Serri (Dal Shabet) 
 Woohee (Dal Shabet) 
 Subin (Dal Shabet)

Black & White
 Jang Su-won (SECHSKIES)

Hokkaido, Japan
 Jang Su-won (SECHSKIES)
 Subin (Dal Shabet)

References

External links
 Official website

South Korean reality television series
South Korean travel television series
Korean-language television shows
2000s South Korean television series
2016 South Korean television series debuts
Television shows set in Guam
Television shows set in Guangdong
Television shows set in Thailand
Television shows set in Jeju Province